Tzivos Hashem (literally, Army of God), is a Brooklyn, New York based organization that was founded in 1980 by the Lubavitcher Rebbe as a youth group of the Chabad movement to increase religious observance and knowledge of Jewish customs and religious practice in less-affiliated Jewish children.

Participants and goals
Tzivos Hashem programs are designed for children under the age of bar/bat mitzvah and are open for children of all levels of Jewish education and commitment to Jewish affiliation, without regard to social and economic status.

The goal of the programs is to increase Jewish identity in children and provide them with a Jewish education through fun, informal programs, publications, and personal encounters. The group and its program of Torah study and performance of mitzvos is designed to prepare children for Jewish adulthood, ensuring continuity of Jewish values and traditions.

Much of the group's activities are targeted at largely unaffiliated or less-affiliated Jewish children, with little knowledge of the Hebrew and Yiddish languages, and encourage the performance of Jewish commandments that are seen as hastening the coming of the moshiach.

History 
Tzivos Hashem began its programs in the autumn of 1980. Over their first ten years programs were expanded to include a magazine, comic books, a radio show, and Shomer Shabbat Little League baseball teams, in addition to other educational programs. Since then the organization has expanded even further and includes video productions, a website, international contests, and involvement in the construction and funding of orphanages in Ukraine, food pantries,  and even a museum for Jewish children.

Publications
Tzivos Hashem publishes three children's periodicals: Moshiach Times, HaChayol, and Tzivos Hashem KIDS!  Moshiach Times was printed at the behest of the Lubavitcher Rebbe.  HaChayol is geared towards children from the Chabad community.  Tzivos Hashem KIDS! is distributed to Chabad Houses throughout the world. Moshiach Times has employed the services of MAD Magazine editor, of Spy vs. Spy, Al Jaffee.  HaChayol has employed Rabbi Chanan Krivisky as an editor in recent times.

References

External links
 Tzivos Hashem Official website

Chabad in the United States
Chabad organizations
Jewish organizations established in 1981
Youth organizations based in New York (state)